The NOFV-Oberliga Nord is the fifth tier of the German football league system in the northern states of the former East Germany and West Berlin. It covers the German states of Berlin, Brandenburg, Mecklenburg-Western Pomerania and northern Saxony-Anhalt. It is one of fourteen Oberligas in German football. Until the introduction of the 3. Liga in 2008 it was the fourth tier of the league system, and until the introduction of the Regionalligas in 1994 the third tier.

Overview 
The NOFV-Oberliga Nord was formed in 1991 when, along with the political reunification of Germany, the former East German football league system was integrated into the unified German one.

The abbreviation NOFV stands for Nordostdeutscher Fußballverband, meaning North East German Football Association.

Along with this league, two other NOFV-Oberligas were formed, the NOFV-Oberliga Mitte and the NOFV-Oberliga Süd.

The league was formed from clubs from five different leagues: Three clubs from the Oberliga Nordost, the former DDR-Oberliga, eight clubs from the NOFV-Liga, the former East German second division, one club from the Bezirksliga Schwerin, one of the regional leagues of the old East German third league level, one from the Verbandsliga Brandenburg, a new league, and six clubs from the Amateur-Oberliga Berlin, the West German third division for the city of Berlin. The league accommodated therefore a wide mix of clubs from the east and west of Germany. With the FC Berlin, the former BFC Dynamo, and Vorwärts Frankfurt, it held two former East German champions as well. It was also the first time since 1950 that clubs from eastern and western Berlin played in the same league.

The league became one of the then ten Oberligas in the united Germany, the third tier of league football. Its champion was however not directly promoted to the 2nd Bundesliga but had to take part in a promotion play-off. In 1993 the league champion was successful in this competition, in 1992 and 1994 they failed.

For the duration of the league and onwards, the leagues below it are:

 Berlin-Liga
 Brandenburg-Liga
 Verbandsliga Mecklenburg-Vorpommern
 Verbandsliga Sachsen-Anhalt (northern clubs only, since 1994)

In 1994, the German football league system saw some major changes. The four Regionalligen were introduced as an intermediate level between the 2nd Bundesliga and Oberligen, relegating the Oberligen to fourth tier from now on. In the east of Germany, the Regionalliga Nordost was formed, a league covering the area of former East Germany and western Berlin. Six clubs from the NOFV-Oberliga Nord were admitted to the new league:

 BSV Brandenburg, now FC Stahl Brandenburg
 Eisenhüttenstädter FC Stahl
 Reinickendorfer Füchse
 Berliner FC Dynamo
 Spandauer SV
 FSV Optik Rathenow

The NOFV-Oberliga Mitte was disbanded and its clubs spread between the two remaining Oberligas in the east. Five clubs from the former league were added to the NOFV-Oberliga Nord, three of them from Berlin and two from the northern part of Saxony-Anhalt. The league now became the only Oberliga with clubs from Berlin.

From 1995 to 1999, the champions of the league were directly promoted to the Regionalliga Nordost. In 1997 and 1999, the runners-up were eligible for promotion too.

With the reduction of the number of Regionalligen to two, the league came under the Regionalliga Nord. Five clubs were relegated that season from the now disbanded Regionalliga Nordost. The regulations about promotion kept on changing and until 2006, the league champion had to play-off with the champion of the southern league for one promotion spot. Only in 2004 did the northern champion come out as a winner of this contest. From the 2006 season onwards, direct promotion was awarded again.

The league changes in 2008 with the introduction of the 3rd Liga meant the Oberligen was now the fifth tier of league football in Germany. The top three teams of the league in 2007–08 gained entry to the Regionalliga, the fourth placed team had to play-off against the fourth placed team from the south for one more spot, these clubs being:

 Hertha BSC II
 Hansa Rostock II
 Türkiyemspor Berlin
 Greifswalder SV qualified for play-offs

Otherwise, the setup of the league did not change and its champion was directly promoted from the 2008–09 season onwards.

Another league reform, decided upon in 2010, saw the reestablishment of the Regionalliga Nordost from 2012 onwards, with the two NOFV-Oberligas feeding into this league again. With the league champions, F.C. Hansa Rostock II being ineligible for promotion TSG Neustrelitz, FSV Optik Rathenow and 1. FC Union Berlin II were directly promoted to the new Regionalliga while Torgelower SV Greif achieved promotion through a play-off round.

Founding members of the league
The founding members of the league in 1991 were:

From the Oberliga Nordost:
 Eisenhüttenstädter FC Stahl
 FC Berlin, renamed Berliner FC Dynamo
 FC Vorwärts Frankfurt/Oder, now 1. FC Frankfurt

From the Verbandsliga Brandenburg:
 FSV PCK Schwedt, later 1. FC Schwedt, disbanded in 1996, reformed as FC Schwedt
From the Bezirksliga Schwerin:
 Blau-Weiß Parchim, now SC Parchim

From the Amateur-Oberliga Berlin:
 Tennis Borussia Berlin
 Spandauer SV, now defunct
 Reinickendorfer Füchse
 Spandauer BC
 Wacker 04 Berlin, now defunct
 BFC Preussen

From the NOFV-Liga Staffel A:
 Greifswalder SC, went bankrupt, reformed as Greifswalder SV
 Bergmann-Borsig Berlin, joined SV Preußen Berlin
 Motor Eberswalde, now Preussen Eberswalde
 MSV Post Neubrandenburg, now 1. FC Neubrandenburg 04
 Stahl Hennigsdorf, now FC 98 Hennigsdorf
 Rot-Weiß Prenzlau, defunct
 Hafen Rostock

Champions of the NOFV-Oberliga Nord 
The league champions:

 Because the 2010-11 champions and runners-up declined promotion to the Regionalliga, the third placed Berliner AK 07 were promoted instead.

Placings in the league 
The complete list of clubs in the league and their final placings:

Key

Notes
 1 In 1999 Spandauer SV withdrew from the Regionalliga to the Verbandsliga.
 2 In 2001 Tennis Borussia Berlin II had to withdraw from the league because of the first team's relegation.
 3 In 2007 FC Schönberg 95 withdrew from the league.
 4 During the 2007–08 season SV Yeşilyurt withdrew its team and merged with Berliner AK.
 5 During the 1997–98 season FSV Velten declared insolvency and folded.
 6 FC Viktoria 1889 Berlin was formed in 2013 from a merger of BFC Viktoria 1889 and Lichterfelder FC.
 7 At the end of the 2013–14 season VSG Altglienicke withdrew from the league.
 8 At the end of the 2011–12 and 2016–17 seasons SV Germania Schöneiche withdrew from the league.
 9 At the end of the 2014–15 season SV Waren 09 and FC Pommern Greifswald both withdrew from the Oberliga while 1. FC Union Berlin II was withdrawn from competitive league football altogether.
 10 1. FC Frankfurt was formed in 2012 from a merger of Frankfurter FC Viktoria and MSV Eintracht Frankfurt.
 11 Greifswalder FC was formed in 2015 from a merger of Greifswalder SV 04 and FC Pommern Greifswald.
 12 At the end of the 2018–19 season SV Altlüdersdorf withdrew from the league.
 13 At the end of the 2020–21 season FC Strausberg withdrew from the league.
 14 At the end of the 2021–22 season Torgelower FC Greif withdrew from the league.

References

Sources 
 Kicker Almanach,  The yearbook on German football from Bundesliga to Oberliga, since 1937. Kicker Sports Magazine.
 Die Deutsche Liga-Chronik 1945-2005  History of German football from 1945 to 2005 in tables. DSFS. 2006.

External links 
 Weltfussball.de Round-by-round results and tables of the NOFV-Oberliga Nord from 1994 onwards 
 NOFV-Oberliga Nord at fussballdaten.de 
 Nordostdeutscher Fußballverband (NOFV) 

NOFV-Oberliga
Oberliga (football)
Football competitions in Berlin
Football competitions in Brandenburg
Football competitions in Mecklenburg-Western Pomerania
Football competitions in Saxony-Anhalt
1991 establishments in Germany
Sports leagues established in 1991